Kohaut is a surname. Notable people with the surname include:

Franz Kohaut (died 1822), Czech botanical collector and gardener
Karl Kohaut (1726–1784), Austrian lutenist and composer of Czech descent

See also
Kohout
Kohut